Netball is the most popular women's team participation sport in Australia. In 1985, there were 347,000 players. In 1995, there were over 360,000 Australian netball players. Throughout most of Australia's netball history, the game has largely been a participation sport; it has not managed to become a large spectator sport. In 2005 and 2006, 56,100 Australians attended one to two netball matches. Of these, 41,600 were women. 46,200 attended three to five netball matches, with 34,400 of those spectators being women. 86,400 attended six or more netball matches, with 54,800 spectators being female. Overall, 188,800 people attended netball matches, with 130,800 being female. In 2005 and 2006, netball was the 10th most popular spectator sport for women with Australian rules football (1,011,300), horse racing (912,200), rugby league (542,600), motor sports (462,100), rugby union (232,400), football (212,200), harness racing (190,500), cricket (183,200) and tennis (163,500) all being more popular. The country set an attendance record for a Netball match with a record crowd of 14,339 at the Australia–New Zealand Netball Test held at the Sydney Super Dome game in 2004.

Netball, at the time called "women's basketball" (distinct from the form of basketball played by women), was introduced to Australia reportedly as early as 1897, although most sources agree that it was established in that country around the start of the 20th century. Interstate competition began in 1924, with the All-Australia Women's Basketball Association formed in 1927. An All-Australian Tournament, later called the Australian National Championships, was first contested between states in 1928, when it was won by Victoria. During the 1930s in Australia, much of the participation in netball at universities was not organised, and players were not required to register. It was believed that this was a positive for Netball as it allowed people to participate who might not have participated otherwise. Australia's national team toured England in 1957. This tour resulted in a number of Commonwealth countries meeting together in order to try to standardize the rules of the game. The sport's name "netball" became official in Australia in 1940. 

In Australia 80% of all netball played is played at netball clubs. The number of Netball Clubs around Australia has been in decline since the 1940s. Between 1985 and 2003, only two Western Australian towns decreased the distance that Netball players had to travel in order to compete; these towns were Brookton and Pingelly. Prior to the creation of the trans-Tasman ANZ Championship in 2013, the National Netball League was the major competition in Australia. It included teams from the Australian Capital Territory, New South Wales, Queensland, Victoria, South Australia and Western Australia. After the 2016 ANZ Championship season, Netball Australia pulled out of that competition and established Suncorp Super Netball as the country's new top league.

The Netball demographic profile is a 18 to 24 year old, unmarried, Australian-born, female who is employed full-time. The average Netball player in New South Wales has played the game for 10.8 years. Most New South Wales based school-aged Netball players play at school and with friends. Girls from non-English speaking backgrounds were more likely to play for fun than their English speaking counterparts, who often played for their school or parents. Non-English speaking girls were less likely to have mothers who played netball, 18.2%, compared to 35.2% for their English speaking counterparts. Most New South Wales based adult players played netball for fun, and for the physical benefits of the sport.

The country has hosted several major important international netball events including:
 The 1967 (Perth), 1991 (Sydney) and 2015 (Sydney) World Netball Championships.
 The Netball Tournament at the 2006 and 2018 Commonwealth Games.
 The 2011 International Challenge Men's and Mixed Netball Tournament in Perth.

The Australian national netball team is regarded as the most successful netball team in international netball. It won the first world championships in 1963 in England, and nine of the twelve Netball World Championships. In addition to being the current world champions, the Australian Diamonds are ranked first on the INF World Rankings.

Australia beat the Silver Ferns to win the World Youth Netball Championships in July 2009 in the Cook Islands. Australia also has a men's national team. It has competed in the 2009 and 2011 International Challenge Men's and Mixed Netball Tournament.

Australian Netball Milestones

1920
 First recorded interstate match, Sydney, Australia

1927
 All Australia Women's Basket Ball Association formed

1928
 First All-Australia Carnival held – in Victoria, Australia

1931
 First AA Umpires Award – Anne Clark, and Elsie Ferres

1938
 First International match (Australia vs. New Zealand, in Melbourne, Australia)

1956
 More than 7,000 people watch Australia defeat England in London

1960
 The International Federation (IFNA) established in August during a Conference in Colombo, Ceylon (now Sri Lanka) and agreement reached on the adoption of an international code of playing rules

1963
 First World Tournament (Eastbourne, England – 11 Countries)
 Australia become the first World Champions

1967
 Australia runner-up to New Zealand at World Tournament

1970
 The sports name changed from Basket Ball to Netball

1971
 Australia wins World Tournament

1975
 Australia wins Netball World Championship

1976
 AA Club Carnival introduced

1978
 First full-time salaried position, National Development Officer, appointed 
 National office established in Martin Place, Sydney, Australia

1979
 Australia equal first (with New Zealand & Trinidad/Tobago) at World Tournament

1980
 First Under Age National Championships (Youth 16 and under at Penrith, Sydney, Australia)
 First National Coaching Director appointed (Joyce Brown)

1981
 Netball becomes one of 8 foundation sports at the Australian Institute of Sport, Canberra, Australia
 1st International Club Competition held in Hawaii (AIS winners)
 A direct mail service – AANA Sports Trading – introduced

1983
 National office relocates to Clarence Street, Sydney, Australia
 International Club Carnival the “Esso Gold” held on the Gold Coast Queensland and televised
 Australia World Champions

1984
 Honorary National Treasurer appointed (Gladys Waugh)
 1st Under 21 Australian Team (Young Australians) selected

1985
 National Executive Administrative Officer appointed (Robert McMurtrie)
 Inaugural National Netball Carnival for Intellectually Disabled Players
 First officially published Annual Report of the AANA (1985/86)
 First National League competition – Esso Superleague

1986
 Purchase of headquarters at Cowper Street, Harris Park in Sydney, Australia
 Incorporation of the Association (All Australia Netball Association Limited)
 Adoption of a Player Trust Fund Policy enables elite players to earn from the sport

1987
 Finals Rounds introduced to Open/21s National Championships
 Australia equal second (with Trinidad/Tobago) to New Zealand at World Tournament

1988
 First World Youth Cup – in Canberram, Australia (Australia Winners)

1990
 National Media Coordinator appointed (Keeley Devery)
 Winners of the Esso Superleague receive the Prime Minister's Cup
 Australian Netball Touring Team visits China as part of Asian development
 Netball is a demonstration sport at Commonwealth Games in Auckland, New Zealand

1991
 Australia hosts the World Championships in Sydney, Australia, and are victorious over New Zealand in the final
 Australia now part of IFNA's Asian region (formerly in Oceania)

1992
 National Umpiring Director appointed (Chris Burton)

1993
 Head Office relocated to Wentworth Street, Parramatta, Sydney, Australia
 Netball acknowledged as a “Recognized Sport” by the International Olympic Committee
 Introduction of a National Umpiring Badge
 Inaugural Australasian Regional Schools Championships

1994
 Association Management Review carried out by Albany Consulting

1995
 New structure approved – Nine Board Directors (including NED)
 Australia retains World Championship crown

1996
 Date of AGM altered to May
 National Netball League Company established
 Australia wins Netball World Youth Cup

1997
 Inaugural year – Commonwealth Bank Trophy competition
 New Financial Year took effect for NA, following the calendar year: January to December
 Launch of Netball Australia Website

1998
 The honorary position of National Liaison Officer is abolished
 Australia wins gold at Commonwealth Games (Kuala Lumpur)

1999
 The Australian 21U coach and AIS head coach positions become one (Norma Plummer)
 First high-performance manager appointed (Sue Hawkins)
 Australia wins World Championships

2000
 Hundreds of netball personnel are recipients of the Australian Sports Medal awarded by the Australian Government
 Australia wins Netball World Youth Cup

2001
 National Netball League Party Limited Company is deregistered

2002
 Head Office relocates to new premises in Marion Street, Harris Park, Sydney, Australia
 Australia retains Commonwealth Games title in Manchester

2003
 Australia runners-up to New Zealand at World Championships

2004
 World Record Crowd (14,339) attends Australia v New Zealand Sydney Test

2005
 Australia places third, behind England (second), and New Zealand (first) at the World Youth Netball Championships (held in Fort Lauderdale, Florida, USA)

2006
 Netball Australia launches the National Membership Administration System which links all clubs, Associations and Member Organisations with Netball Australia for the first time
 Australia wins silver at the Melbourne 2006 Commonwealth Games. New Zealand wins gold.
 Commonwealth Bank Trophy celebrates its 10th season since its inception, in 1997

2007
 Head Office relocates to new premises in King Street, Melbourne, Australia
 Australia wins the 2007 World Netball Championships held in Auckland, New Zealand

2008
 Inaugural year of the ANZ Championship (replacing Commonwealth Bank Trophy)
 Establishment of the Australian Netball League, the country's second-tier feeder league
 National team becomes the "Australian Netball Diamonds”

2009
 Australia wins the World Youth Netball Championships in the Cook Islands, beating New Zealand in the Final.

2010
 Australia wins silver at the Delhi 2010 Commonwealth Games. New Zealand win gold.
 Sharelle McMahon honored by the Australian Commonwealth Games Association. She was chosen to lead the Australian team out as opening ceremony flag bearer at the Delhi Commonwealth Games.

2011
 Australia wins the 2011 World Netball Championship held in Singapore, the 10th world title.
 Lisa Alexander takes over as Diamonds coach from Norma Plummer following the World Championships.
 Queensland Firebirds create history by completing the ANZ Championship season undefeated.

2013
 Netball Australia moves head office into the new Netball HQ located in Fitzroy.
 Australia wins silver at the 2013 World Youth Netball Cup played in Glasgow, Scotland. New Zealand wins gold.
 Australia's Fast5 Netball World Series team rebranded as the `Fast5 Flyers’.

2017
 Establishment of the new Suncorp Super Netball competition, the country's new premier domestic netball league.
 Re-alignment of the Australian Netball League second-tier competition.

References

Bibliography

External links 
Netball Australia

 
Women's sport in Australia